Vincent Talio (born March 7, 1981 in Saint-Nazaire) is a French professional football player. Currently, he plays in the Championnat Suisse.

He played on the professional level in the Scottish Football League First Division for Raith Rovers, joining them in July 2003. He scored his first and only goal for Raith in a Scottish Cup defeat to Kilmarnock, before leaving the club in February 2004.

References

1981 births
Living people
French footballers
French expatriate footballers
Expatriate footballers in Scotland
Expatriate footballers in Switzerland
Raith Rovers F.C. players
Luçon FC players
Sportspeople from Saint-Nazaire
Association football midfielders
Footballers from Loire-Atlantique